Makhan Singh may refer to:
Makhan Singh (Kenyan trade unionist) (1913–1973), Punjab-born labor union leader; credited with establishing foundations of Kenya's trade unionism
Makhan Singh (sprinter) (1937–2002), Indian track and field athlete
Makhan Singh (discus thrower), Indian track and field athlete and winner at the 1951 Asian Games
Makhan Singh, one of ring names used by American wrestler Mike Shaw (1957–2010)